Lord Thomas Cecil (1797–1873) was a British peer and member of Parliament for Stamford from 1818 to 1832.

Cecil was the youngest of the three sons of Henry Cecil, Earl of Exeter,by his second wife Sarah. He was educated at Eton and  St John's College, Cambridge, graduating in 1815. 

He married, on 8 August 1838, Lady Sophia Lennox, daughter of Charles Lennox, Fourth Duke of Richmond, but they had no children. He died on 29 November 1873.

References

1797 births
1873 deaths
Alumni of St John's College, Cambridge
Members of the Parliament of the United Kingdom for English constituencies
People educated at Eton College
UK MPs 1818–1820
UK MPs 1820–1826
UK MPs 1826–1830
UK MPs 1830–1831
UK MPs 1831–1832